Rodolfo D. Nebres (born January 14, 1937) is a Filipino comics artist who has worked mostly as an inker in the American comic book industry. Known for his lush, detailed inklines, Nebres' most prolific period was in the late 1970s and the 1980s.

Career
Before coming to the United States, Nebres studied fine arts in the Philippines and worked in the Filipino comics industry for such publishers as Bulaklak Publishing, ACE Publications, and Graphic Arts Service (GASI).

Shortly after DC Comics editor Joe Orlando and publisher Carmine Infantino's 1971 visit to the Philippines to scout talent, Nebres began working for the American comics industry. 
His debut for DC was the story "The Exterminator" in House of Mystery #210 (Jan. 1973) followed by "The Witch Doctor's Magic Cloak" in House of Secrets #112 (Oct. 1973). From 1973–1977, Nebres was a part of fellow Filipino cartoonist Tony DeZuniga's studio and emigrated to the United States in 1975. Nebres' first Marvel Comics credit was a text article in Savage Tales #6 (Sept. 1974) and he inked the story "Dark Asylum" in Giant-Size Dracula #5 (June 1975) which was John Byrne's first work for Marvel. Nebres later drew Doctor Strange, John Carter, Warlord of Mars, Marvel Super Special, and Power Man and Iron Fist and contributed to Marvel's black-and-white magazine line, Curtis Magazines, most notably on Deadly Hands of Kung Fu.

From 1980–1983, he drew stories for Warren Publishing's Creepy, Eerie, Vampirella, and 1984 titles. Following his stint at Warren, Nebres worked for Pacific Comics, Archie Comics' short-lived superhero line, and Continuity Comics. Nebres then focused on storyboards and commercial art and largely left the comics industry.

In 2000, SQP Inc. published The Art of Rudy Nebres, a collection of fan commissions.

Awards
Rudy Nebres received an Inkpot Award at the San Diego Comic-Con in 2012. In 2017, Nebres was awarded the Inkwell Awards Joe Sinnott Hall of Fame award for "an inking career in American comic books of outstanding accomplishment."

Personal life
Nebres resides in New Jersey with his wife, Dolores. They have two children, Melvin and Edwin.

Bibliography

Archie Comics
 Comet #1 (1983)
 Fly #2–3, 5 (1983–1984)
 Lancelot Strong, the Shield #1–2 (1983)
 Mighty Crusaders #3–5 (1983–1984)

Berserker Comics
 Maura #1 (2009)

Charlton Comics
 Emergency! #4 (1977)

Continuity Comics

 Armor #2–10, 12–13 (1986–1992)
 Armor vol. 2 #1–2 (1993)
 Hybrids #3 (1993)
 Hybrids vol. 2 #1 (1994)
 Megalith #1 (1989) 
 Ms. Mystic vol. 3 #2 (1993)
 Ms. Mystic Deathwatch 2000 #3 (1993)
 Samuree #1–2, 4 (1993–1994)
 Toyboy #1–6 (1986–1988)
 Valeria the She-Bat #2 (1995)

CrossGen
 CrossGen Chronicles #7 (2002)
 Negation: Lawbringer #1 (2002)
 Sigil #26 (2002)
 Sojourn #21 (2003)

DC Comics

 Arion, Lord of Atlantis #29 (1985)  
 Batman #382, 384  (1985)  
 Ghosts #75 (1979)  
 House of Mystery #210 (1973)  
 House of Secrets #112 (1973)  
 Showcase '94 #2 (1994)  
 The Unexpected #165, 215 (1975–1981)  
 Who's Who: The Definitive Directory of the DC Universe #6 (1985)
 The Witching Hour #55 (1975)

Marvel Comics

 The Amazing Spider-Man Annual #24 (1990)  
 The Avengers #178 (1978)  
 Conan the Barbarian #158 (1984)  
 Conan the Savage #1–4 (1995)  
 Deadly Hands of Kung Fu #9–10, 12–14, 16–24, 29, 33 (1975–1977)
 Doctor Strange vol. 2 #20, 22–24, 26, 32–33 (1976–1979)  
 Epic Illustrated #1 (Silver Surfer) (1980) 
 Giant-Size Dracula #5 (1975)
 Haunt of Horror #5 (1975)  
 The Hulk! #14–16 (1979)  
 John Carter, Warlord of Mars #2–5, 8–9, 11–16 (1977–1978)  
 King Conan #17–18 (1983)  
 Kull the Destroyer #25–26 (1978) 
 Marvel Classics Comics #5  ("Black Beauty") (1976)  
 Marvel Premiere #44 (Jack of Hearts) (1978)  
 Marvel Super Special #11–13 (Weirdworld) (1979)  
 Marvel Tales #242 (1990)
 Official Handbook of the Marvel Universe #3–8 (1983)
 Official Handbook of the Marvel Universe Deluxe Edition #3, 7–9, 17 (1986–1987)
 Power Man and Iron Fist #76 (1981)  
 The Punisher vol. 2 #97–100 (1994–1995)  
 The Rampaging Hulk #1–3 (Ulysses Bloodstone backup stories) (1977)  
 Red Sonja vol. 3 #7 (1985)  
 Savage Sword of Conan #20, 37, 53, 88, 93, 96, 98, 107, 114–115, 121, 127 (1977–1986)
 Star Wars Annual #2 (1982)  
 Tales of the Zombie #10 (1975)  
 Tarzan #21 (1979)

Pacific Comics
 Bold Adventure #1–3 (1983–1984)
 Silver Star #5 ("Last of the Viking Heroes" backup feature) (1983)

The Comic Coffin
 The Depths of Gnar Collection #1 (2014)

Valiant Comics
 H.A.R.D. Corps #26 (1995)
 Solar, Man of the Atom #41 (1995)
 Timewalker Yearbook #1 (1995)

Warren Publishing

 1984 #1–10 (1978–1979)
 1994 #11–13, 15–16, 18, 21–22, 25, 28 (1980–1982)
 Creepy #96, 110, 115, 120, 122–131, 133–134, 138 (1978–1982)
 Eerie #95, 111, 118, 127–129, 134, 139 (1978–1983)
 The Goblin #1–3 (1982)
 The Rook #1–2, 10–14 (1979–1982)
 Vampirella #84, 88–90, 92–96 (1980–1981)

References

External links 

 
 
 Rudy Nebres at Mike's Amazing World of Comics
 Rudy Nebres at the Unofficial Handbook of Marvel Comics Creators

1937 births
20th-century Filipino male artists
21st-century Filipino male artists
Advertising artists and illustrators
American comics artists
Comics inkers
DC Comics people
Filipino comics artists
Filipino emigrants to the United States
Filipino illustrators
Filipino storyboard artists
Inkpot Award winners
Living people
Marvel Comics people